Andrieux is a French surname. People with the name include:

 Anne Andrieux (born 1979), French volleyball player
 Clément-Auguste Andrieux (1829–1880), French artist
 François Andrieux (1759–1833), French playwright
 Henri Andrieux (1931–2008), French cyclist
 Jacques Andrieux (1917–2005), French military aviator
 Louis Andrieux, French politician and father of Louis Aragon
 Luc Andrieux (1917–1977), French actor
 Mailyne Andrieux (born 1987), French tennis player
 Maurice Andrieux (1925–2008), French politician
 Michel Andrieux (born 1967), French rower
 Renatus Andrieux (1742–1792), French Jesuit killed during the French Revolution
 Robert Andrieux ( 1920), Belgian sports shooter
 Sylvie Andrieux (born 1961), French politician
 Virginie Andrieux (born 1980), French weightlifter

See also
 Andrieu, a surname